Nokogiri may refer to:

 Japanese saw, a woodworking saw
 Nokogiri (software), a library to parse HTML and XML

See also 
 Mount Nokogiri (disambiguation)